The Zimbabwe Pistol and Smallbore Association (ZPSA) is the Zimbabwean association for practical shooting under the International Practical Shooting Confederation. Zimbabwe was a founding member of IPSC and had a delegate on the Columbia Conference in 1976.

References 

Regions of the International Practical Shooting Confederation
Sports governing bodies in Zimbabwe